Scientology in Pakistan is said to be followed among a very small number of people, mainly from the middle and upper classes of Karachi. The Dianetics Centre of Karachi for Personal Excellence, located in Gulshan-e-Iqbal, is affiliated with the Church of Scientology. The center provides introductory courses, individual counseling and life improvement courses. 

Several Scientology-affiliated organisations are active in the country. Youth Together for Human Rights Education (YTHRE), affiliated with Youth for Human Rights International, promotes human rights education and has conducted workshops on character development for thousands of participants. The Criminon program, run by the Scientologist community under the coordination of the Society for Advancement of Health, Education and the Environment (SAHEE), has been used to rehabilitate over 1,500 prisoners in Pakistani jails. Over 12,000 policemen have also attended Criminon workshops. The Study Tech teaching method developed by L. Ron Hubbard has been adopted in schools in Pakistan, a program for which Applied Scholastics has trained many teachers. Scientologist-run Assist teams have aided in several relief operations throughout the country in times of natural disasters.

Religion

 Religion in Pakistan

References

External links
 Dianetics Centre of Karachi for Personal Excellence

Religion in Pakistan
Pakistan